Progress 19 was a Soviet uncrewed Progress cargo spacecraft, which was launched in February 1984 to resupply the Salyut 7 space station.

Spacecraft
Progress 19 was a Progress 7K-TG spacecraft. The 19th of forty three to be launched, it had the serial number 120. The Progress 7K-TG spacecraft was the first generation Progress, derived from the Soyuz 7K-T and intended for uncrewed logistics missions to space stations in support of the Salyut programme. On some missions the spacecraft were also used to adjust the orbit of the space station.

The spacecraft were powered by chemical batteries, and could operate in free flight for up to three days, remaining docked to the station for up to thirty.

Launch
Progress 19 launched on 21 February 1984 from the Baikonur Cosmodrome in the Kazakh SSR. It used a Soyuz-U rocket.

Docking
Progress 19 docked with the aft port of Salyut 7 on 23 February 1984 at 08:21 UTC, and was undocked on 31 March 1984 at 09:40 UTC.

Decay
It remained in orbit until 1 April 1984, when it was deorbited. The deorbit burn occurred at 18:18 UTC, with the mission ending at around 19:05 UTC.

See also

 1984 in spaceflight
 List of Progress missions
 List of uncrewed spaceflights to Salyut space stations

References

Progress (spacecraft) missions
1984 in the Soviet Union
Spacecraft launched in 1984
Spacecraft which reentered in 1984
Spacecraft launched by Soyuz-U rockets